Dichomeris punctatella is a moth in the family Gelechiidae. It was described by Francis Walker in 1864. It is found in Amazonas, Brazil.

Adults are ferruginous, the wings narrow with a short fringe and the forewings slightly acute with a convex exterior border.

References

Moths described in 1864
punctatella